East Yingao Road is a station on Line 10 of the Shanghai Metro. Located at the intersection of East Yingao Road and Songhu Road in the city's Yangpu District, it opened with the rest of the first phase of Line 10 on April 10, 2010.

References 

Railway stations in Shanghai
Line 10, Shanghai Metro
Shanghai Metro stations in Yangpu District
Railway stations in China opened in 2010